John Brown Clark (born 22 September 1964) is a Scottish former footballer. He is best known for his achievements in a lengthy playing career with Dundee United. He top scored for them in the run to the 1987 UEFA Cup Final in which he scored in the defeat in the final. Among his four goals in that run was one against F.C. Barcelona at Camp Nou in the quarter final.

He also played for Stoke City, Falkirk, Dunfermline Athletic, Ross County, Ayr United and Berwick Rangers.

Career

Dundee United
Clark was born in Edinburgh and joined Dundee United in 1976 and began to play for the reserves as a forward where he scored over 100 goals. He made his debut in the 1982–83.

His best season was 1986–87 where he featured prominently at centre half. He was their top scorer on the way to the 1987 UEFA Cup Final with a goal against each of Universitatea Craiova, Hajduk Split and F.C. Barcelona at the Camp Nou. He also scored in the second leg of the final at Tannadice Park as United lost 2–1 to IFK Göteborg.

That same season United also lost the 1987 Scottish Cup Final to St Mirren as they also did the season after to Celtic. Clark remained a regular in the Tannadice defence for the late 1980s and early 1990s making 330 appearances scoring 37 goals.

Stoke City
He moved to English club Stoke City in January 1994. Clark started his Stoke against Barnsley in a 3–0 defeat. He ended the 1993–94 season with 12 appearances. In 1994–95 Clark played in six matches and scored his only goal for Stoke which came in a 2–0 victory over Cesena in the Anglo-Italian Cup. When Lou Macari replaced Joe Jordan as manager in September 1994 Clark returned to Scotland.

Later career

Clark next joined Falkirk before transferring part way through his second season to Dunfermline. He had short spells also playing for Ayr United, Ross County and Berwick Rangers. He became Assistant Manager at Berwick.

Clark then dropped out of senior football with Gala Fairydean where he became player-manager. He became manager of Whitehill Welfare in 2004.

Career statistics
Sourced from 

A.  The "Other" column constitutes appearances and goals in the Anglo-Italian Cup and UEFA Cup.

Honours
 Dundee United
 Scottish Cup runner-up: 1986–87, 1987–88, 1990–91
 UEFA Cup runner-up: 1986–87

References

External links
 
 

1964 births
Living people
Footballers from Edinburgh
Scottish footballers
Scottish Football League players
English Football League players
Dundee United F.C. players
Stoke City F.C. players
Falkirk F.C. players
Dunfermline Athletic F.C. players
Ross County F.C. players
Berwick Rangers F.C. players
Gala Fairydean Rovers F.C. players
Ayr United F.C. players
Scottish football managers
Association football central defenders
Gala Fairydean Rovers F.C. managers